Linyuan Ocean Wetland Park is a wetland in Linyuan District, Kaohsiung, Taiwan.

Geography
Located at Gaoping river mouth estuary, the wetland spreads over an area of 50 hectares. The wetland consists of 10 species of marine creatures.

See also
 Geography of Taiwan

References

Landforms of Kaohsiung
Wetlands of Taiwan